Hope Nakazibwe Grania is a Ugandan politician, and laboratory scientist. She is the current woman member of parliament Mubende District. Hope is married to Dr Andrew Abaasa.

Background 
She was born on 20 January 1986, to Hindia Mpuuga and Norah Mbabazi of Mubende District.

Education 
She attended Tiger Army primary School in Mubende District for elementary education in 1999, Kasenyi SS in Mubende for her ordinary education and Christ the King Bulinda for her advanced level education. Hope holds a diploma in medical laboratory  science from Makerere Paramedical School Mulago (2008), She also holds a bachelor's degree in medical laboratory sciences from Mbarara University of Science and Technology where she won a convocational award as the best student of 2012. She also holds a master of public health from Uganda Martyrs University and a Certificate in Biomedical scientific manuscript writing from the University of California San Francisco USA.

Work history 

Hope served as a laboratory technologist at Mengo Hospital in 2008. Between 2009-2010, she worked as a laboratory field supervisor in Integrated Community Based Initiatives (ICOBI) in Mubende and Kassanda districts. She also worked as a laboratory supervisor ICOBI Kampala central division in 2013. She joined Uganda Virus Research Institute /Medical Research Council and London School of Hygiene and Tropical Medicine in 2013, leading; the hematology department 2013-2015, Biochemistry 2015-2016, Molecular 2017-2020 and Joined active politics in 2020.

Political career 

In 2020, Hope Nakazibwe Grania  contested for Mubende District Women's Constituency on the National Resistance Movement political party ticket where she defeated Benna Namugwanya, the former State Minister in charge of Kampala Capital City Authority (KCCA). She has represented that constituency in the Parliament of Uganda until today. She also serves as the Secretary General in the Uganda Women Parliamentary Association, She is also the NRM party parliamentary whip for greater Mubende.

References 

Members of the Parliament of Uganda
Women members of the Parliament of Uganda
21st-century Ugandan women politicians
21st-century Ugandan politicians
1985 births
Living people